Edgewater Beach may refer to the following places:

 Edgewater Beach, Ontario
 Edgewater Beach, Wisconsin
 Edgewater Beach, a section of Edgewater, Chicago

See also 
 Edgewater Beach Hotel, hotel in Edgewater, Chicago